The Panorama Guizhou International Women's Road Cycling Race is an annual professional road bicycle race for women in China.

Winners

References

Cycle races in China
Recurring sporting events established in 2018
Women's road bicycle races
Annual sporting events in China